Sir John Leslie, 2nd Baronet   (7 August 1857 – 25 January 1944) was an Anglo-Irish soldier and baronet.

Early life
Leslie was born on 7 August 1857. He was the only son of Sir John Leslie, 1st Baronet, and Lady Constance Wilhelmina Frances Dawson-Damer.  His father was the Conservative Member of Parliament for Monaghan from 1871 to 1880 and was created a baronet in 1876. After his father's death in January 1916, Leslie succeeded his father as the 2nd Baronet Leslie, of Glaslough.

His maternal grandfather was Colonel George Lionel Dawson-Damer and his paternal uncle was Charles Powell Leslie, also a Member of Parliament. His ancestor, the Right Reverend John Leslie, Bishop of the Isles, moved from Scotland to Ireland in 1633 when he was made Bishop of Raphoe in County Donegal and was subsequently made Bishop of Clogher in 1661.

Career
Leslie was commissioned into the Grenadier Guards, with whom he served as a lieutenant at the Battle of Tel el Kebir in 1882, distinguishing himself under fire. After fighting in South Africa during the Second Boer War in 1900, he was appointed lieutenant-colonel of the 5th Battalion, Royal Irish Fusiliers in April 1902, and later became honorary colonel of the battalion.

He served as High Sheriff of Monaghan in 1905 and was also a Justice of the Peace and Deputy Lieutenant for the county. The Leslies were opposed to the Home Rule movement. Leslie led the Monaghan Militia in the 1890s and he allowed the Ulster Volunteers drill at the demesne in 1914. A loyalist paramilitary group calling itself the Ulster Volunteer Force was formed in 1966. It claims to be a direct descendant of the older organisation and uses the same logo, but there are no organisational links between the two.

Personal life

On 2 October 1884 in New York City, with disapproval from both families, Leslie married Leonie Blanche Jerome (1859–1943), daughter of the wealthy American financier Leonard Jerome and Clarissa (née Hall) Jerome. Leonie's sister was Jennie, wife of Lord Randolph Churchill and mother of Winston Churchill. Leslie and his wife had four children:
 Sir John Randolph Leslie, 3rd Baronet (1885–1971), who married Marjorie Ide, daughter of Henry Clay Ide, the American Governor-General of the Philippines.
 Captain Norman Jerome Beauchamp Leslie (1886–1914), who was killed in action in Armentières, France, during World War I.
 Seymour William Leslie (1889–1979), who married Gwyneth Rawdon Roden (1903–1999) in 1929.
 Lionel Alistair David Leslie (1900–1987), who married Barbara Yvonne Enever in 1942.

The Leslie family were one of the largest land-owning families in the late 19th century. Their holdings comprised  in counties Cavan, Donegal, Down, Fermanagh, Meath and Tyrone. In his second autobiographical book, Lionel recounted various anecdotes about his immediate family and their home at Castle Leslie in County Monaghan.

Sir John Leslie died in Glaslough, County Monaghan in Ireland on 25 January 1944.

Descendants
Through his eldest son, he was the grandfather of Anita Theodosia Moira Rodzianko King (1914–1985), a novelist who married Commander Bill King; Sir John Leslie, 4th Baronet (1916–2016), popularly known as Sir Jack Leslie, who never married; and Desmond Arthur Leslie (1921–2001), a pilot and film maker.

References

External links
 

1857 births
1944 deaths
People educated at Eton College
Baronets in the Baronetage of the United Kingdom
19th-century Anglo-Irish people
20th-century Anglo-Irish people
High Sheriffs of Monaghan
Commanders of the Order of the British Empire